The 2008–09 season of the Norwegian Premier League, the highest bandy league for men in Norway.

21 games were played, with 2 points given for wins and 1 for draws. Solberg won the league, whereas Mjøndalen and Ready survived a relegation playoff.

League table

References
Table

Seasons in Norwegian bandy
2008 in bandy
2009 in bandy
Band
Band